Mířkov is a municipality and village in Domažlice District in the Plzeň Region of the Czech Republic. It has about 300 inhabitants.

Administrative parts
The village of Křakov is an administrative part of Mířkov.

References

Villages in Domažlice District